The 2015 Southern Conference men's basketball tournament took place Friday, March 6 through Monday, March 9 in Asheville, North Carolina, at the U.S. Cellular Center. The entire tournament was streamed on ESPN3, with the Southern Conference Championship Game televised by ESPN2. The champion, Wofford, received an automatic bid into the 2015 NCAA tournament.

With the addition of East Tennessee State and Mercer, all 10 teams participated in the tournament.

Format
All ten conference members qualify for the tournament. Teams were seeded based on conference winning percentage. The top six seeds received a first-round bye, with the bottom four teams playing two first-round games.

Tiebreaking system
The tiebreaking system is as follows:

 Two teams
 Head to head record
 Best record against the highest seeded team not involved in the tie. Continue down through the standings until the tie is broken.
 Higher RPI, as published by RPIRatings.com

 Three or more teams
 Best record against all teams involved in the tie
 Best record against the highest seeded team not involved in the tie. Continue down through the standings until the tie is broken.
 Higher RPI, as published by RPIRatings.com

Seeds

Schedule

Bracket
 

* denotes overtime period

All-tournament team

First Team
Stephen Croone, Furman
James Sinclair, Western Carolina
Karl Cochran, Wofford
Spencer Collins, Wofford
Lee Skinner, Wofford

Second Team
Kris Acox, Furman
Geoff Beans, Furman
Devin Sibley, Furman
T. J. Hallice, Mercer
Ike Nwamu, Mercer

References

Tournament
Southern Conference men's basketball tournament
Southern Conference men's basketball tournament
Southern Conference men's basketball tournament
Basketball competitions in Asheville, North Carolina
College sports tournaments in North Carolina
College basketball in North Carolina